The Williams House, also known as the Clinch Valley Coal and Iron Company Office, is a historic home and office located at Richlands, Tazewell County, Virginia. It was built in 1890, and is a -story, frame Georgian Revival style dwelling. It has a hipped roof with pedimented dormers and features a one-story, hip-roofed front porch supported by six slender Tuscan order columns.  It originally served as the office for the Clinch Valley Coal and Iron Company, developer of Richlands.  The building was sold in 1901 to Dr. William R. Williams, who used it as a residence.  In 1984, it became the location of the town's branch of the Tazewell County Public Library.

It was listed on the National Register of Historic Places in 1982.  It is located in the Richlands Historic District.

References

Houses on the National Register of Historic Places in Virginia
Georgian Revival architecture in Virginia
Houses completed in 1890
Houses in Tazewell County, Virginia
National Register of Historic Places in Tazewell County, Virginia
Individually listed contributing properties to historic districts on the National Register in Virginia
Former houses in the United States
Libraries in Virginia